Honkytonk Films is a new media production company based in Paris, France.

Founded in 2007 by Arnaud Dressen, and Benoit de Vilmorin, the company develops, produces and distributes multimedia documentaries on all platforms (TV, Internet and mobile) worldwide.

Since 2008, Honkytonk has realized co-productions of web-documentaries such as Journey to the End of Coal, that  received SCAM award of the multimedia work in 2009.

The company is also dedicated to developing and distributing Klynt, an application dedicated to interactive editing.

Productions

 2010 : iROCK, Web documentary directed by Lionel Brouet
 2009 : The Challenge, Web Documentary directed by Laetitia Moreau
 2009 : The Big Issue, Web Documentary, directed by Samuel Bollendorff and Olivia Colo
 2008 : Journey to the End of Coal, Web Documentary directed by Samuel Bollendorff and Abel Ségrétin

Awards
 2009 : Sheffield Doc/Fest (Sheffield, UK), special mention for innovation awards, The Big Issue.
 2009 : Prix Europa (Berlin, Germany), special mention in emerging media awards, The Big Issue.
 2009 : Prix SCAM 2009 in new technology class, digital interactive artwork award, Journey to the End of Coal.

Research and development: Klynt

Klynt is an application dedicated to new media content producers. It was developed to create interactive rich media stories on the Internet.

It includes:
 an interactive media editor (text, photo, vidéos, audio, graphics and any type of web content),
 a HTML5 rich media player (ready to be embedded on any web page),

     Examples of projects produced using Klynt:  
     - Journey to the End of Coal
     - The Big Issue

External links
 http://www.honkytonk.fr/
 http://www.klynt.net/

References

Documentary film production companies
Film production companies of France
Digital media organizations
Mass media in Paris